Morgan Gesmalla (born 1947) is a Sudanese sprinter. He competed in the men's 100 metres at the 1968 Summer Olympics.

References

1947 births
Living people
Athletes (track and field) at the 1968 Summer Olympics
Sudanese male sprinters
Olympic athletes of Sudan
Place of birth missing (living people)